This is a list of Albanians in Montenegro that includes both Montenegrin people of Albanian descent and Albanian immigrants that have resided in Montenegro. The list is sorted by the fields or occupations in which the notable individual has maintained the most influence.

For inclusion in this list, each individual must have a Wikipedia article indicating notability and show that they are Albanian and have lived in Montenegro.

Politics

Daut Boriçi –   Albanian politician
Albin Kurti –   Albanian Kosovan politician
Mirash Ivanaj –   Albanian politician
Nikollë Ivanaj –   Albanian journalist, publisher and writer
Mark Gjonaj –  politician Democratic Party for District 80 in the New York State Assembly
Dritan Abazi –  Albanian Montenegrin politician, President of United Reform Action and current member of Parliament of Montenegro; current prime minister of Montenegro
Gëzim Hajdinaga –  Montenegrin-Albanian politician
Fuad Nimani –   Montenegrin-Albanian politician
Nazif Cungu –   Montenegrin-Albanian politician
Liri Berisha –   Albanian pediatrician

Military
Lika Ceni –   Albanian pirate leader
Ali Pasha of Gusinje –   Albanian military commander and one of the leaders of the League of Prizren
Mujo Ulqinaku –  officer in the Royal Albanian Army and People's Hero of Albania
Pretash Zekaj Ulaj –   Albanian tribal leader
Sulejman Pačariz –   Islamic cleric and commander of the detachment of Muslim militia
Ded Gjo Luli –  (1840–1915) leading nationalists of the Albanian revolt against Turkey.
Sokol Baci – Albanian leader in the liberation of Malesia from Ottoman rule.
Baca Kurti Gjokaj – Albanian nationalist
Cel Shabani –   Albanian commander of the Albanian forces of the League of Prizren in 1879
Jakup Ferri –   Leader of Albanian irregulars from Plav and member of the nationalist Albanian League of Prizren
Tringe Smajli –   Albanian guerrilla fighter who fought against the Ottoman Empire in the Malësia region
Çun Mula –   Albanian freedom fighter
Cafo Beg Ulqini – Albanian nationalist

Science and Academia
Nokë Sinishtaj – Albanian writer and poet
Gjelosh Gjokaj – Albanian painter, and graphic artist.
Ćamil Sijarić – Montenegrin novelist and short story writer
Mark Lucgjonaj – Albanian poet
Nikolla bey Ivanaj –   Albanian journalist, publisher and writer
Hajro Ulqinaku –   Albanian writer
Esad Mekuli –   Albanian poet and scholar
Rexhep Qosja – prominent Albanian academic (lives in Kosovo)
Mehmet Kraja – Albanian writer, literary critic and journalist
Isuf Dedushaj – Albanian epidemiologist

Musicians
Kristine Elezaj – Albanian-American recording artist
Malësor Prenkoçaj – Albanian singer
Adrian Lulgjuraj – Albanian singer, winner of the Festivali i Këngës 51.
Nikollë Nikprelaj – Albanian singer
Rexho Mulliqi – Montenegrin composer
Enisa Nikaj - Albanian-American pop singer
Edita Abdieski – Swiss pop singer
Ledri Vula – Albanian rapper, singer and songwriter
David Dreshaj – Albanian singer

Models
Afërdita Dreshaj – Albanian model
Emina Cunmulaj – Albanian-American model

Cinema
Nickola Shreli – Albanian-American actor
Victor Gojcaj – Albanian-American actor
Yllka Mujo – Albanian actress
Pjetër Gjoka –  actor and People's Artist of Albania
Pjeter Malota –  Albanian actor, martial artist.
Enver Gjokaj – Albanian-American actor

Religious
Rrok Mirdita – Catholic Archbishop of Durrës-Tirana, and the Primate of Albania
Gjon Buzuku – Albanian Catholic priest who wrote the first known printed book in the Albanian language: Meshari

Sports
Lesh Shkreli – football player
Ardian Đokaj – football player
Fatos Bećiraj – football player
Sead Hakšabanović – football player
Emrah Klimenta – football player
Ronaldo Rudović – football player
Halil Kanacević – American-born Montenegrin professional basketball player
Arijanet Muric – football player
Driton Camaj – football player
Aljbino Camaj – football player
Mirnes Pepić – football player
Idriz Toskić – football player
Aldin Adžović – football player
Ermin Seratlić – football player
Samir Shaptahoviç – former Kosovo Albanian professional basketball player, who last played for KB Peja
Dijana Ujkić –  Montenegrin handball player
Kristijan Vulaj – football player
Ema Ramusović –  Montenegrin handball player
Alija Krnić – football player

References

Montenegro
Montenegro
Ethnic groups in Montenegro